The 2010 Categoría Primera B season is the 21st season since its founding and is officially called the 2010 Torneo Postobón for sponsorship reasons.

Teams

First stage

Standings

Results

Regular matches

Regional derbies (Rounds 9 & 27)

Second stage

Cuagranguar Semifinals

Group A

Group B

Final

Aggregate table

Relegation/promotion playoff

References 

Categoría Primera B seasons
2010 in Colombian football
Colombia